The Perth Ice Arena (also known as Perth Ice Arena Centre.) is an ice sports and public skate centre, built in 2009 and located at the Malaga precinct of Perth, in Western Australia. The arena serves as the home ice rink for the Perth Thunder in the Australian Ice Hockey League and West Coast Ice Hockey Club who compete in WA state leagues.

Facilities

Events 

Perth Ice Arena regularly hosts figure skating (including academy), ice hockey, functions (including birthday parties, social clubs, bucks and hens nights and youth groups), disco nights and general public sessions.

Since 2012, the arena has annually hosted fourteen regular season Australian Ice Hockey League (AIHL) matches involving Perth Thunder between the months of April and August.

The Perth Ice Arena in 2016 played host to one of the USA vs Canada Ice Hockey Classic exhibition matches. Team Canada defeated Team USA 6-5 in a shootout in game two. The series has been running since 2015 and has brought a number of current and past NHL players and coaches along with a host of AHL and ECHL players to Australia and New Zealand during that time. Players and coaches donate their time to raise money for the STOPCONCUSSIONS Foundation and awareness of the sport of ice hockey to Australia and New Zealand.

See also
List of ice rinks in Australia
 Sport in Western Australia

References

External links
 
 Australian Ice Hockey League
 West Coast Ice Hockey

Ice hockey venues in Australia
Sports venues in Perth, Western Australia
2009 establishments in Australia
Sports venues completed in 2009
Indoor arenas in Australia
Figure skating venues in Australia
Speed skating venues in Australia
Malaga, Western Australia